The 1947 International University Games were organised by the Confederation Internationale des Etudiants (CIE) and held in Paris, France, between 24 and 31 August. At these games a number of athletic and cycling events were contested.

Athletics

Men's events

Women's events

Cycling

Medal table
incomplete (of the 28 athletics events, only 25/26 are listed)

References
World Student Games (Pre-Universiade) – GBR Athletics 

Athletics at the Summer Universiade
Uni
World Championships
International cycle races hosted by France
1947 in French sport
1947 in cycle racing